Primitive Lyrics (aka "PL") was a hip hop crew, founded 1991 in Zürich, Switzerland. The group was one of the first Swiss dialect hip hop crews. Primitive Lyrics combined live rock music (drums, bass, guitar, saxophone) together with a DJ and two rappers.

After their first maxi single 'Tescht', they released their first album Halbi Nüni Chlorzicht in 1994. Primitive Lyrics' main domain was live concerts, so they toured through Switzerland and Germany. In 1995 PL released a second maxi single and in 1997 their second album called PLAG, meaning "plague" in Swiss German. The second meaning is "PL AG" (Aktiengesellschaft), which translates into "Primitive Lyrics Ltd".

The band dissolved in Autumn 1997 after the PLAG Tour. On 8 September 2001 they gave a one-time "reunion" concert in Seebach, Zurich which happened open-air under heavy rain.

In 2003 rappers Jet Domani and Redl founded the hip hop group Radio 200000 together with Sgoing Erlöst and Krasseranz.

Members

 Oliver Baumgartner aka Baumee aka Jet Domani - rap
 Patrick Wehrli aka Redl - rap
 Koni Weber -drums
 Watezz Bleuer - bass until 1995
 Raffi Schmid - bass from 1996
 Ivo Pescia - guitar
 Alexx Bossard - saxophone & flute
 Patrick Hollenstein aka Kay-Zee DJ, sampling and fx

Discography
Albums
 1994 Halbi Nüni Chlorzicht
 1997 PLA

Maxi-singles/EPs
 1993 Tescht
 1995 Druck vo allne Siite

References

External links
 http://www.primitivelyrics.ch/
 http://www.radio200000.ch/

Swiss hip hop groups